Small form factor (abbreviated: SFF or SFX) is a term used for desktop computers and for some of its components, gabinet and motherboard, to indicate that they are designed in accordance with one of several standardized computer form factors intended to minimize the volume and footprint of a desktop computer compared to the standard ATX form factor (industrial designer pattern).

For comparison purposes, the size of an SFF case is usually measured in litres. SFFs are available in a variety of sizes and shapes, including shoeboxes, cubes, and book-sized PCs. Their smaller and often lighter construction has made them popular as home theater PCs and as gaming computers for attending LAN parties. Manufacturers also emphasize the aesthetic and ergonomic design of SFFs since users are more likely to place them on top of a desk or carry them around. Advancements in component technology together with reductions in size means a powerful computer is no longer restricted to the huge towers of old.

Small form factors do not include computing devices that have traditionally been small, such as embedded or mobile systems. However, "small form factor" lacks a normative definition and is consequently open to interpretation and misuse. Manufacturers often provide definitions that serve the interests of their products. According to marketing strategy, one manufacturer may decide to mark their product as "small form factor" while other manufacturers are using different marketing name (such as "Minitower", "Microtower" or "Desktop") for personal computers of similar or even smaller footprint.

History
The acronym SFF originally stood for "Shuttle Form Factor," describing shoebox-sized personal computers with two expansion slots. The meaning of SFF evolved to include other, similar PC designs from brands such as AOpen and First International Computer, with the word "Small" replacing the word "Shuttle".

SFF originally referred to systems smaller than the Micro-ATX. The term SFF is used in contrast with terms for larger systems such as "mini-towers" and "desktops."

Features
Small form factor computers are generally designed to support the same features as modern desktop computers, but in a smaller space. Most accept standard x86 microprocessors, standard DIMM memory modules, standard 8.9 cm (3.5") hard disks, and standard 13.3 cm (5.25") optical drives.

However, the small size of SFF cases may limit expansion options; many commercial offerings provide only one 8.9 cm (3.5") drive bay and one or two 13.3 cm (5.25") external bays. Standard CPU heatsinks do not always fit inside an SFF computer, so some manufacturers provide custom cooling systems. Though limited to one or two expansion cards, a few have the space for -length cards such as the GeForce GTX-295.  Most SFF computers use highly integrated motherboards containing many on-board peripherals, reducing the need for expansion cards. As of 2020 many SFF PC cases do not include any expansion bays larger than 2.5 inches (large enough to accommodate SATA SSDs), due to the declining popularity of optical disc drives and 3.5 inch hard drives in the consumer space.

Even if labeled "SFF," cube-style cases that support full-sized (PS2 form factor) power supplies actually have a microATX form factor. True SFF systems use SFX, TFX or smaller power supplies, and some require a laptop-style external "power brick."

Some SFF computers even include compact components designed for mobile computers, such as notebook optical drives, notebook memory modules, notebook processors, and external AC adapters, rather than the internal power supply units found in full-size desktop computers.

Enthusiast community and crowdfunding 

Crowdfunding and availability of rapid prototyping tools has enabled the production of several mini-ITX cases focusing on efficiently organizing commercial computer components into small volumes including the Ghost S1, DAN A4-SFX, and Thor Zone MJOLNIR. Communities of enthusiasts and reviewers now develop and promote enhanced SFF assembly, maintenance, and performance criteria. 3D printing and Laser cutting have enabled customization and one-off production by both manufacturers like Lazer3D and individual users with access to the relevant equipment.

SFF types 
The many different types of SFFs are categorized loosely by their shape and size. The types below are available .

Cubic / Shoebox 

Many SFF computers have a cubic shape. Smaller models are typically sold as barebones units, including a case, motherboard, and power supply designed to fit together. The motherboard lies flat against the base of the case. Upgrade options may be limited by the non-standard motherboards, cramped interior space, and power and airflow concerns. The Power Mac G4 Cube, released in 2000, and the Shuttle XPC are good examples of this design. MSI and Asus produce similar designs. The Xi3 Modular Computer is an example of a cube computer with a little more upgrade possibilities.

Shuttle has adapted several of its XPC models (some 5-series and most later) to alternately accept mini-ITX motherboards. The base of the XPC is provided with mounting points which accommodate both "Shuttle form factor" (ShFF) and mini-ITX motherboards. In order to accommodate mini-ITX motherboards, two of the ShFF mounting points are simply relocated (the remaining mini-ITX mounting points are in common with the remaining ShFF mounting points). A "standard" ShFF motherboard is 20.6 cm (8 1/8″) wide by 27.3 cm (10 3/4″) deep, with the I/O shield and the two PCI slots being located in common with mini-ITX motherboards. Most ShFF systems utilize Shuttle's proprietary heat pipe (liquid cooling) system, "Integrated Cooling Engine" (ICE), for the processor, although several also feature heat pipe cooling for the voltage regulator and/or the chip set (Northbridge). When an ShFF system is upgraded to a mini-ITX motherboard, an Intel or compatible processor fan must replace the ICE cooler. The ShFF's ICE computer fan is so designed that it may be repurposed as a case fan when the case is upgraded to mini-ITX use. When so upgraded, the repurposed fan would be connected to the motherboard's case fan connector (3-pin) while the new CPU fan would be connected to the motherboard's CPU fan connector (4-pin).

AOpen Inc. produced a stackable S120 case, allowing the user to stack up to four components vertically or horizontally. These layers can be for add-on cards, optical drives, and hard drives, using either internal power supplies or external AC adapter power sources. After the S120, AOpen made more small form factor cases for systems with Micro ATX and Mini-ITX.

Nettop 

Until 2005, SFF cases were usually sold as barebones units (case, power supply, and motherboard) to system integrators and home-based builders. In 2005, Apple Inc. introduced its Mac Mini (volume of 1.4 L, excluding external power brick). Later in the same year, the first AOpen mini PC MP915 (renamed to XC mini in 2007 since "mini PC" could not be registered as a trademark), was announced. The size of the XC mini series PC—16.5(W) × 5.0(H) × 16.5(D) cm—makes it one of the smallest desktop PC systems (1.3L volume). It was criticized for looking like the Apple Mac Mini but Apple has not taken action on this subject. In February 2007, AOpen redesigned the case of the mini PC MP945 series.

Since 2006, major OEM PC brands such as HP and Dell have begun to sell fully assembled SFF systems. These are often described as bookshelf units since they resemble a miniature tower case small enough to fit on a bookshelf. The HP Slimline series and Dell Dimension C521 (volume 1.65 L) are good examples of this trend. The Maxdata Favorite 300XS is another mini computer. The HP Slimline uses a non-standard motherboard that is very similar in size to Mini-ITX.

In addition to its industrial use, the extremely small Mini-ITX motherboard form factor has also been incorporated into SFF computers. These are often extremely compact, incorporating low-power components such as the VIA C3 processors. The Travla C134 is an example of this design. At 17.8 x 25.4 x 5.1 cm (7 × 10 × 2") the Travla C134 is somewhat larger than the Mac mini which is 16.5 x 16.5 x 5.1 cm (6.5 × 6.5 × 2") and barely bigger than a standard 13.3 cm (5.25") optical drive.

Beginning in 2007, several other companies have released other very small computers that besides a small size, focus on a low price, and extremely high power efficiency (typically 10 W or below in use). These include the Zonbu, fit-PC, Linutop, and A9home. With the release of Intel Atom CPU, AOpen also made Nettop systems: the uBox series with model LE200 and LE210. The uBox series equips a dual core Intel Atom 270/330 processor, single channel DDR-II 533/667 memory, Intel 945GC+ICH7 chipset, three SATA connectors and 5.1 channel high definition audio output.

Home theatre boxes 
Essentially a bookshelf-style case lying on its side, a miniature HTPC replicates the look of other smaller-than-rack-sized home theatre components such as a DVR or mini audio receiver. The front panel interface is emphasized, with the optical disc drive rotated relative to the case in order to maintain horizontal mounting, and more motherboard port connectors (such as for USB) are routed to the front panel, they normally are as powerful as PC desktops.

Computer-on-module 

A computer-on-module (COM) is a complete computer built on a single circuit board. They are often used as embedded systems due to their small physical size and low power consumption. Gumstix is one manufacturer of COMs.

Ultra-Small Form Factor 
Each model of Dell's OptiPlex line of computers typically includes an Ultra-Small Form Factor (USFF) chassis option. In the Core 2 era, these machines used 8.9 cm (3.5") desktop hard drives and external power supplies, such as the OptiPlex 745 and 755. More recent units use 6.4 cm (2.5") laptop hard drives and have integrated power supplies, such as the OptiPlex 990 USFF. The compact size comes at the cost of restricted expandability, as USFF models have no PCI or PCIe slots and may have limited CPU and memory options.

Micro
Starting from Series 5, USFF was replaced with Micro variants, an even smaller size option that uses external power supplies and does not have optical drives.

Ultra-compact Form Factor 

Understood as comprising nano-ITX (12 × 12 cm) and pico-ITX (10 × 7.2 cm) boards, the format was championed by VIA Technologies. Intel now describes its own Next Unit of Computing (NUC) products (10.2 x 10.2 cm or 4 × 4") as UCFF.

See also 
 ATX
 Case modding
 Nettop
 PC-on-a-stick
 Mac mini 
 Business SFF-class nettops:  Dell OptiPlex, Fujitsu Esprimo, Lenovo ThinkCentre, HP ProDesk and EliteDesk
 Single-board microcontroller
 List of Arduino compatibles
 Small Form Factor Committee
 Small Form Factor Special Interest Group (SFF-SIG)
 Low-profile video card
 Mini-ITX

References

Motherboard form factors